The Mindanao Gazette is a newspaper of general circulation since 1992 by the late Judge Leonardo M. Barnes, (Ret.). Published every day with editorial and business address at No. 30 Yakal Street, Palm Village, Davao City.

Newspapers published in Davao City
Daily newspapers published in the Philippines